Bùi Thị Phương Thanh (born 27 April 1973), is a Vietnamese contemporary singer. She is one of the most renowned singers from Vietnam. Thanh is known for her diverse styles, especially when performing on stage. She also possesses a unique, unusual singing voice, gaining her recognition throughout the Vietnamese community as well as the music business.

Biography
Thanh was born in a rural part of the Thanh Hóa Province, Vietnam, the second youngest of seven siblings in a disadvantaged family.

When Thanh was six years old, her family moved to Ho Chi Minh City, formerly known as Saigon. Her father died when she was thirteen. The Bui family went through financial problems following her father's death without his financial support of the family.

Thanh attended Lê Quý Đôn High School. There, Thanh focused on acting, fashion and music, much to her mother's initial disapproval. She took part in every contest to do with show business, and to earn money to support her family.

Until the end of 1991, Thanh lived in obscurity. Her luck changed when a friend invited her to work for the youth movement and join the Labor Theatre House, a  Vietnamese club for young singers. Thanh had a strong desire to sing. Her performing was excellent and her voice appealing and she soon found herself singing at wedding parties and restaurants all around Vietnam. She was not yet a star, but her family's economic situation improved greatly. She would ultimately become one of the most renowned Vietnamese female singers.

Tam ca Sao Dem (The Night Star Trio)
Even though Thanh was doing very well, critics said her style needed improvement. In 1993, she joined the singing group "Tam ca Sao Dem" (The Night Star Trio) and had the opportunity to be heard by songwriter Bao Phuc. From that time, Thanh received guidance from Bao Phuc, who trained her to be a successful singer - teaching music and performance techniques as well as fashion classes. Thanh was so enthusiastic that she decided to follow a professional career in music, and ultimately started a solo career.

Solo career
Shortly after, Phuong Thanh found her own unique style: rock combined with a formidable and whole-hearted voice. She was well received by her audiences. The beauty of her voice won even the most critical of listeners. With songs like "Giã Từ Dĩ Vãng" (Farewell to the past), "Trống Vắng" (Emptiness), "Tình Cờ" (Unexpected), "Xin Làm Người Hát Rong", one of Phuong Thanh's more emotional ballads, "Còn Mãi Mùa Đông" (Everlasting Winter) and "Khi Giấc Mơ Về" (When dreams come) started airing on Vietnamese radio, listeners started to adore Phuong Thanh and she was gained wide acclaim, soon performing live in many venues.

Unique styles
Nothing of what Phuong Thanh does follows a pattern. In one way or another she succeeds in surprising her audience with her strong, eccentric "rebel" personality.

Thanh once confessed to a reporter: "...Truly speaking, I often shock the listeners whenever I show up on stage, especially the young ones" (translated from Vietnamese).

Sometimes Thanh surprises the audience by a storm debut, and other times she is calm, dressed as an ordinary girl with faded jeans and provocative T-shirts.

Performing talent
Often, it is seen by many of Thanh's critics that as soon as she starts performing, "it is like she is not herself anymore". Her eyes often sparkle with tears, carrying her heart through all the words in the lyrics.  When performing on stage, she seems to "forget who she is". As well as this, many are attracted to Thanh because of her unusual appearance and voice. She is one of very few young singers who won the audience's approval for being so honest.

Phuong Thanh is a simple and sincere woman who is never afraid to open her heart to her listeners through her music. Many strongly believe that her energy comes from her life experiences, as she had to struggle to support her family throughout her adolescent years.

Despite of her rather unsophisticated outfits on stage, Phuong Thanh has made a name for herself in the music business and the Vietnamese community alike.

Views on injustice 

Phuong Thanh has also spoken out against prejudice and injustice on homosexual people in her community. In 2003, she and many other Vietnamese singers, most of whom being friends of Thanh, agreed to sign a petition against unfair treatment of homosexuals and disadvantaged people such as prostitutes. Thanh has spoken about her experience with this issue on many occasions: "One day, I sang the song "Khi Giấc Mơ Về" (When dreams come) at a lounge; there was this prostitute who gave me flowers and cried. She told me how my song really touched her. Because of the flowers and the way she commented me, it changed my thoughts about her. They also have souls,  and the need to be loved and protected."

Many in the Vietnamese community admire Phuong Thanh not just for her singing, but for her bravery in often risking her reputation to speak her mind about important social issues.

Discography 
Studio albums
 Trái tim không ngủ yên (1997)
 Một thời đã xa (1999)
 Lang thang - Tình 2000 (1999)
 Tiếng rao (2000)
 Kẻ hát rong (2000)
 Nếu như - Trót yêu (2001)
 Khi giấc mơ về (2002)
 Hãy để em ra đi - Vì em yêu anh (2003)
 Quay về ngày xưa (2004)
 Thương một người (2005)
 Tìm lại lời thề (2006)
 Sang mùa (2007)
 Chanh bolero (2007)
 Nào có ai biết (2010)
 Con ốc bươu (2011)
 Mùa xuân đầu tiên (2015)
 Tâm sự ngày đông (2016)
 Về quê (2016)

Compilation albums
 The best tình 2010 (2010)

EPs
 Giã từ dĩ vãng (1998)
 Quay về đây - Mèo hoang (2011)

Single
 Thành phố gì kỳ (17/12/2021)
 Xuân hạ thu đông 39 (14/2/2022)

Video albums
 Live Show 2002 (2002)
 Chanh's Show (2007)
 Mưa Show (2008)

TV shows

Present life
Phuong Thanh is currently living in Ho Chi Minh City.

In 2005, she gave birth to a baby girl, named Hà Nghi Phương.

See also
Music of Vietnam

References

External links
 
 Vox Phuong Thanh - A site entirely devoted to Phuong Thanh and her music by Voxpt
 Chanh Online  Grew from phuongthanh.tinhyeu.net.  Regularly updated with mainly Phuong Thanh news.  Most of her songs can be listened to online here.
  FanClub of Phuong Thanh  Grew from chanhonline.com.  Regularly updated with news about Phuong Thanh.
  Inner Sanctum Interview with Phuong Thanh
  Vietnamese music site featuring Phuong Thanh
  Page of Phuong Thanh in site of Contemporary Singers From Vietnam
  Vietnamese singers gallery
  News on the latest Saigon singers

1973 births
Living people
People from Thanh Hóa province
21st-century Vietnamese women singers
20th-century Vietnamese women singers
Vietnamese LGBT rights activists